Maurya is a surname used by Kushwaha caste in Uttar Pradesh. The community called Kushwaha are also known as Koeri, Kachhi, Shakya, Murao and Saini in various parts of the state of Uttar Pradesh. They are  second largest OBC group in Bihar and Uttar Pradesh after Yadavs and are one of the most politically organised peasant community in India after Jats, Yadavs and Kurmis.

Notable people

Anil Kumar Maurya, Member of Uttar Pradesh Legislative Assembly from Ghorawal Assembly constituency.
Asha Maurya, Member of Uttar Pradesh Legislative Assembly from Mahmoodabad Assembly constituency.
Ashutosh Maurya, Member of legislative assembly from Bisauli Assembly constituency of Uttar Pradesh.
Swami Prasad Maurya; National General Secretary of Samajwadi Party and former Minister in Government of Uttar Pradesh.
Keshav Prasad Maurya; Deputy Chief Minister of Uttar Pradesh.
Rajendra Kumar Maurya, Member of Uttar Pradesh Legislative Assembly from Pratapgarh Assembly constituency.
Sanghmitra Maurya, Member of Parliament (Lok Sabha) from Badaun Lok Sabha constituency.
Vikramjeet Maurya, former member of Uttar Pradesh legislative assembly from Phaphamau Assembly constituency and former minister in Yogi Adityanath's cabinet.
Uday Lal Maurya, former Member of Uttar Pradesh Legislative Assembly. (16th Uttar Pradesh Assembly)
Vijay Maurya, indian actor, writer and director.
Teddy Maurya, indian actor, writer, director and musician.

See also
Kushwaha (surname)

References